Aleš Trčka (born 14 August 1961) is a Czech former cyclist. He competed for Czechoslovakia in the team pursuit event at the 1988 Summer Olympics.

References

External links
 
 

1961 births
Living people
Czech male cyclists
Olympic cyclists of Czechoslovakia
Cyclists at the 1988 Summer Olympics
Sportspeople from Prague